Richard Twining FRS (5 May 1772 – 14 October 1857) was a British tea merchant. He was the eldest son of Richard Twining (1749–1824), a director of the East India Company, and the head of Twinings the London tea merchants.

Life
Richard Twining was born on 5 May 1772 at Devereux Court, Strand, London. He was educated at Norwich Grammar School by Samuel Parr.

Twining joined his father's tea business in 1794, and worked for Twinings until five weeks before his death. He was elected a Fellow of the Royal Society on 5 June 1834.

Twining married Elizabeth Mary Smythies, the daughter of the Rev. John Smythies, on 5 May 1802. He and his wife had nine children, including the social reformer Louisa Twining, and the botanical illustrator Elizabeth Twining.

Richard Twining died on 14 October 1857. He is buried at Kensal Green Cemetery.

References

1772 births
1857 deaths
Burials at Kensal Green Cemetery
Fellows of the Royal Society
Richard
Businesspeople in tea